The Larches can refer to:

 The Larches (Cambridge, Massachusetts), United States, an historic house
 The Larches, Kent, a nature reserve in England
 The Larches, Monmouthshire, a hillfort in Wales, United Kingdom